Oenanthe javanica, commonly Java waterdropwort, water celery, water dropwort, Chinese celery, Indian pennywort and Japanese (flat leaf) parsley, is a plant of the genus Oenanthe originating from East Asia. It has a widespread native distribution in temperate Asia and tropical Asia, and is also native to Queensland, Australia.

This plant should not be confused with the plants of the genus Cryptotaenia, sometimes called "Japanese wild parsley" (mitsuba in Japanese), Apium graveolens var. secalinum which is also called "Chinese celery", or other plants called "water dropwort" and "water celery".

Description
Oenanthe javanica is a perennial herb that grows to about 1 m in height, with fibrous roots that emerge from all nodes, and flowers with 5 white petals and 5 stamens. The leaves are aromatic, glabrous, and have a sheath covering the stem. The leaflets are divided into lobes and crinkled. The 'Flamingo' variety has colorful pink edges. The plant grows wild in moist areas, along streams and on the edges of ponds.

The plant is considered officially invasive in several states of the United States.

Culinary use
While many other species of Oenanthe are extremely toxic, Oenanthe javanica is edible, and is cultivated in China, India, Japan, Korea, Indonesia, Malaysia, Thailand, Taiwan, and Vietnam, as well as in Italy, where its spring growths are relished as a vegetable.

India
Known locally as komprek, it  is commonly consumed in the Northeast Indian state of Manipur, where it is one of the main ingredients in Manipuri eromba and singju.

Japan
Called seri in Japanese, it is one of the ingredients of the symbolic dish consumed in the Japanese spring-time festival, Nanakusa-no-sekku.

Korea
In Korea, the plant is called minari and is eaten as namul vegetable.<ref>Journal of Plant Biology - Volumes 45-46 2002- Page 83  "The cultivated type , “ Minari ” , is a major vegetable crop . These two types are not easily distinguishable ; even quantitative characters such as leaf and petiole size cannot be used as criteria for their classification . "</ref>  The award-winning 2020 drama film Minari'' is named for the vegetable.

Constituents
The plant contains persicarin and isorhamnetin.

See also
 Nanakusa-no-sekku

References

External links 
 
 

Apioideae
Asian vegetables
Edible Apiaceae
Flora of Queensland
Flora of temperate Asia
Flora of tropical Asia
Perennial vegetables